Michałów  is a village in Pińczów County, Świętokrzyskie Voivodeship, in south-central Poland. It is the seat of the gmina (administrative district) called Gmina Michałów.

Michałów State Stud is the largest Arabian horse farm in Poland.

References

Villages in Pińczów County